Akiya (秋谷) is a Japanese surname. Akiya can also mean an abandoned, vacant house (空き家).

Notable people with the surname include:

, Japanese Buddhist leader
Karl Ichiro Akiya (1909-2002), Japanese-American activist, Communist, author, and internee
, Japanese voice actor

Akiya is also a masculine Japanese given name. Notable people with the name include:

, Japanese retired professional wrestler.
, Japanese art historian
, Japanese former footballer

See also
Akiya (Assyrian king), an Assyrian king of the old Assyrian period

Japanese-language surnames
Japanese masculine given names